Raffles Institution (RI) is an independent educational institution in Singapore. Founded in 1823, it is the oldest school in the country. It provides secondary education for boys only from Year 1 to Year 4, and pre-university education for both boys and girls in Year 5 and Year 6. Since 2007, RI and its affiliated school Raffles Girls' School have been offering the six-year Raffles Programme, which allows students to skip the Singapore-Cambridge GCE O-Level examinations and proceed to take the Singapore-Cambridge GCE A-Level examinations at the end of Year 6.

RI is notable for having produced 96 President's Scholars, three presidents, two prime ministers, four speakers of Parliament, several Cabinet ministers and Members of Parliament, as well as many chief executive officers of statutory boards, agencies and state-owned companies. Its alumni body, the Old Rafflesians Association (ORA), includes former Prime Ministers Lee Kuan Yew and Goh Chok Tong, as well as former Presidents Yusof Ishak, Benjamin Sheares and Wee Kim Wee.

RI has one of the highest admission rates to the elite universities of the world such as the Ivy League and Oxbridge. It had the highest number of admissions to the University of Cambridge, with 48 students receiving offers in the 2022 admissions cycle, while 52 were accepted for Oxford and Cambridge combined in 2021, and 77 in 2022 (2nd highest of all schools).

History

Foundation
RI was founded by Stamford Raffles, who proposed the establishment of "the Institution" or "Singapore Institution" at a meeting he convened on 1 April 1823. Raffles wanted to establish a college for the people of Singapore since the founding of the colony, and wrote on 12 January 1823 that a site for a planned college had been selected. His intention was to provide education for the children of local leaders in the new British colony of Singapore as well as the company's employees and others who wished to learn the local languages. Another objective was to "collect the scattered literature and traditions of the country" so that the most important may be published and circulated. Raffles referred to the plan as his "last public act"; by setting up the Institution, he hoped it that it could, through its generations of alumni, serve as "the means of civilising and bettering the conditions of millions" beyond Singapore. Those involved in the plan for the Institution included Reverend Robert Morrison, Sophia Raffles, William Farquhar, and William Marsden. It was initially suggested that the Institution should merge with the Anglo-Chinese College founded by Morrison in Malacca, but this plan did not materialise. Raffles contributed S$2,000, secured a grant of S$4,000 from the British East India Company and, together with subscriptions from other individuals, raised funds totalling S$17,495 for the project. He drafted the curriculum, and set up the structure for the board of trustees that included William Wilberforce.

The original building of RI was sited on Bras Basah Road and it was designed by engineer Philip Jackson. Raffles laid the foundation stone of the building on 5 June 1823, a few days before he left Singapore for the last time on 9 June. No classes were held while the building was under construction, but the project stalled and the building was left unfinished for some time. Raffles' vision was also not shared by John Crawfurd, the British Resident of Singapore, who felt the scale of the project excessive, and that the government should focus its efforts on elementary education instead. In 1835, a group of European merchants raised money for the Raffles Monument Fund to commemorate Raffles' contribution to Singapore, and proposed that it should be used to complete the Institution. George Drumgoole Coleman was then hired to finish and extend the original building by Jackson.

Early years
On 1 August 1834, Reverend F. J. Darrah opened the Singapore Free School with 46 boys, which quickly grew to nearly 80. When the building for the Institution was completed in 1837, the school applied to occupy the building, a proposal the trustees of the Institution accepted.  The Singapore Free School moved into the building in December 1837, and became the Institution Free School. It was, however, established as an elementary school rather than the college that Raffles had initially intended. Originally the school offered classes in Malay, Chinese and English, but the Malay classes soon closed in 1842 due to low enrolment, and it would eventually become an English-medium school. In May 1839, the first wing extension was completed, and the second at the end of 1841. In 1856, the Singapore Institution Free School was renamed Singapore Institution.

In the 1860s, the school gradually turned into a high school. In 1868, the school was renamed Raffles Institution in honour of its founder. The most significant headmasters of the period were J. B. Bayley and R. W. Hullett, who oversaw the transition and ran the school for a cumulative period of 50 years.

The school is Singapore's first institution to enrol girls, with 11 pupils accepted in 1844. In 1879, the girls' wing of the school was established as a separate but affiliated school, Raffles Girls' School.

Relocation
In March 1972, the school moved to Grange Road. The old building was demolished and replaced by Raffles City Shopping Centre. The Bras Basah campus's library building is featured on the S$2 paper and polymer note in Singapore currency.

In 1984, RI became one of two schools selected by the Ministry of Education to pilot the Gifted Education Programme to cater to intellectually gifted students.

In 1990, the school moved again, this time from Grange Road to a new campus at Bishan, then a recently created new town.

Raffles Junior College

In 1982, Raffles Junior College (RJC) was established at Paterson Road to take over the school's burgeoning pre-university enrolment. It subsequently moved to Mount Sinai Road in 1984.

In 2004, the six-year Raffles Programme was offered to Secondary 1 to 3 students. It allows RI students to skip the Singapore-Cambridge GCE Ordinary Level examinations, which students would previously sit for at the end of Year 4. Instead, they move on directly to RJC for Years 5 and 6 and sit for the Singapore-Cambridge GCE Advanced Level examinations at the end of Year 6. This frees up time which students would otherwise spend on preparing for the O Level examinations, allowing them to spend more time engaging in enrichment and co-curricular or passion-driven activities. The curriculum serves to "seek to nurture the best and brightest into men and women of scholarship who will be leaders of distinction, committed to excellence and service in the interest of the community and nation." This subsequently led to the merging of RI's GEP and Special/Express streams to form a single Raffles Programme stream, and the establishment of its in-house academic talent development programme, Raffles Academy, catering to exceptionally gifted students via subject-specific pullout classes from Year 3 onwards, in 2007.

In 2005, RJC, along with Hwa Chong Junior College, became one of the first junior colleges in Singapore to attain independent status. RJC moved to its new Bishan campus adjacent to RI at the start of the 2005 school year, after attaining independent status and becoming the first pre-university institution in Singapore to be awarded the School Excellence Award.

In 2009, RI and RJC re-integrated to form a single institution under the name "Raffles Institution" to facilitate the running of the Raffles Programme and better align processes and curriculum.

School identity and culture 
RI is a member of various academic partnerships and alliances, such as the G30 Schools and Winchester Network. It also co-founded the Global Alliance of Leading-Edge Schools.

Motto 
The school motto - Auspicium Melioris Aevi - comes from the coat of arms of its founder, Stamford Raffles. The official translation by the school is "Hope of a Better Age".

Houses 
The five houses, three of them named after former headmasters, are Bayley, Buckley, Hullett, Moor and Morrison, represented by the colours yellow, green, black, red and blue respectively.

 C. B. Buckley was the Secretary to the Board of Trustees of Raffles Institution.
 J. B. Bayley was a Headmaster who "raised Raffles Institution to a large and flourishing establishment", as recorded by the board of trustees.
 J. H. Moor was the first Headmaster of the school, whose 4th great-grandson is Justin Trudeau, Prime Minister of Canada.
 Reverend Robert Morrison was the co-founder of Raffles Institution.
 R.W. Hullett was Raffles Institution's longest-serving Headmaster (31 years).
Year 1 students are sorted into houses by class. In the early years of RI's history, there were ten houses, including a sixth Philips house (purple), later disbanded. House allocations used to be student-based, instead of class-based. Each House is led by a House Captain, a Year 4 student, who carries out his role along with the respective House Committee. The Houses participate in inter-house tournaments and activities, notably including the annual Inter-House Sports Carnival, Dramafeste and the Inter-House Debate tournament, with points earned from each activity contributing to the House Championship which is awarded at the end of the school year.

Students of the college section were divided into five Houses, the name of which is an amalgamation of its counterparts in RI and RGS:
  Buckle-Buckley
  Bayley-Waddle
   Hadley-Hullett
  Moor-Tarbet 
  Morrison-Richardson

Uniform 
The school uniform from Years 1 to 4 is all-white, including a white short-sleeved shirt with the school badge at the top-right corner of the shirt pocket. Lower secondary students (Years 1 and 2) wear white short trousers and white socks. From Year 3 onwards, students may continue in short pants or opt for white long trousers. Shoes are white-based for all students, with the exception of laces, which must be fully white. Year 3 and 4 prefects must wear formal black shoes, except for Physical Education lessons, where they are required to change into appropriate shoes. School ties are worn only for formal occasions. Teachers wear a formal gown for special occasions. The uniform for male students in Years 5 and 6 male are identical to the uniforms worn by students in Years 3 and 4. The uniform for female students in Years 5 and 6 consist of a white blouse and a dark green pleated skirt.

Discipline 
In his memoir The Singapore Story, Lee Kuan Yew mentioned that he was caned by the headmaster D. W. McLeod for chronic tardiness when he attended RI in the 1930s. In 1956, a former RI prefect also wrote that during his time there, "boys were caned on their bottoms for even winking at the girls. We did have very good discipline in our time and the boys became good citizens, lawyers, doctors, etc."

Curriculum and student activities 

Since 2007, the school has offered the six-year Integrated Programme, which allows students to bypass the Singapore-Cambridge GCE Ordinary Level examinations and take the Singapore-Cambridge GCE Advanced Level examinations at the end of Year 6. Known within the Raffles schools as the Raffles Programme, it is offered jointly with Raffles Girls' School.

Orientation programmes

Year 1 Orientation Camp 
The new intake of Year 1 students go through a 3-day orientation camp, involving understanding the school's culture and knowing the campus grounds, and various activities to facilitate class bonding, leadership development, etc. Year 4 Peer Support Leaders and the Head and Deputy head prefects guide them through this camp and the rest of the orientation period. At the end of the camp, the first-year students receive their school badges in the Junior Rafflesian Investiture Ceremony (JRIC), which occurs on the Friday of the Orientation Week.

Raffles Leadership Programme 
The Raffles Leadership Programme is an initiative of the Leadership Development Department, aimed at preparing students to take on positions of leadership in school and in life. All Year 3 pupils go through the programme which includes going through the Leadership Challenge Workshop and taking the Myers-Briggs Type Indicator Instrument. It also features a one-term residential component at RI Boarding. The boarding programme started as a trial in 2008 and has now become a full-cohort programme.

Under the Raffles Leadership Programme, Year 3 pupils also get to take part in a ten-week residential programme in RI Boarding to learn about independent living skills. The boarding programme was shortened to a seven-week programme in 2019.

Students' Council (Year 5-6) 
The Students' Council of the Years 5-6 section is divided into a total of eight departments, namely the Welfare Department, the Communications Department, the CCA Department and five House Directorates, which form the EXCO for each of the five houses. Each councillor also takes up one or two of the six functions, which are college events organised by the council: National Day, Teachers' Day, Grad Night, Open House, Orientation and Council Camp.
Members of the Students' Council are selected through a college-wide election process. Each batch undergoes a rigorous selection process, which culminates in the Council Investiture. The Students' Council is headed by a President, who is assisted by his/her executive committee consisting of two vice-presidents, two Secretaries, the three Heads of Departments and the five House Captains. As of May 2022, the school is served by the 42nd batch of Student Councillors.

Co-curricular activities

Year 1-4 (Secondary School section) 
RI offers about 40 co-curricular activities (CCAs), including sports, uniformed groups, performing arts, and clubs and societies.

CCAs are categorised as either core or merit CCAs. Core CCAs comprise all sports, uniformed groups and performing arts, as well as Raffles Debaters while merit CCAs consist of all other clubs and societies. Every student of the school takes up at least one core CCA. Merit CCAs are optional, but students are encouraged to take up at least one merit CCA to supplement their core CCA. Certain merit CCAs, such as the Infocomm Club, however, may substitute for a core CCA instead.

The school's sports teams and uniformed groups have earned top places in many national inter-school competitions, doing well in Red Cross Youth, rugby, National Cadet Corps, sailing, floorball, Boys' Brigade, and cross-country running, among others.

The performing arts groups have also done well in the Singapore Youth Festival, held once every two years, while the clubs and societies have also won awards.

Year 5-6 (Junior College Section) 
The Year 5-6 section offers over 70 CCAs, including sports, performing arts, and clubs and societies. Unlike in the first four years of the Raffles Programme, no distinction is made between core and merit CCAs. Students may offer up to two CCAs, no more than one of which may be a sports or performing arts group.

Teams from RI performed well nationally in 2011, with the performing arts groups clinching 15 Golds (including nine with honours) and five Silvers at the biennial Singapore Youth Festival Central Judging and the sports teams winning 32 championship titles as well as 24 Silvers and 11 Bronzes at the National Interschools Sports Championships. The school's clubs and societies have also performed excellently in their various national competitions, with Raffles Debaters clinching championship titles and the History and Strategic Affairs Society clinching best school delegation awards at international Model United Nations conferences.

Publications 
The college community is served by the Raffles Press, the school's journalism society, which publishes its flagship online student newspaper Word of Mouth. The newspaper includes features, op-ed columns, sports reports and concert reviews. In addition, all staff and most students also receive a copy of the Rafflesian Times, the school's official magazine, from the Communications Department.

The journalism society regularly publishes articles dealing with daily school life, recent assemblies and events as well as wider national issues including Singapore's golden jubilee (SG50) and the 2015 Southeast Asian haze.

In 2015, students from the school also started an unofficial satirical publication, The Waffle Press, which pokes fun at school events and examinations.

Boarding 

Raffles Institution Boarding is housed in a boarding complex consisting of five blocks. These are named after the five Houses; Bayley, Buckley, Hullett, Moor and Morrison. Each block, apart from the new Hullett block, can accommodate 90 pupils. All blocks have their own staff, and the boarding complex is overseen by several Boarding Mentors.

History 
The foundation stone of the Boarding Complex was laid by Lee Kuan Yew on 25 March 1994. The first batch of boarders moved into the Complex in 1996. During the upgrading works in 2006, the former Moor block was demolished to make way for a 13-storey twin tower hostel, the Hullett block, completed in July 2007, and the former Hullett block in turn renamed Moor. The three blocks of Buckley, Moor and Bayley houses boys enrolling in Raffles Leadership Programme, whereas Morrison block catered to girls previously.

Campus 

The Raffles Institution Year 1 - 4 campus consists of six main blocks on 18.65 hectares of land.

Yusof Ishak Block (Former Admin Block)

The main building is the Yusof Ishak Block, comprising offices, staff rooms, lecture theatres, study areas and computer labs, as well the Main Atrium. It houses the Year 1-4 General Office and the Raffles Archives & Museum. Major upgrading works were completed in early 2007.

Science Hub 
The Science Hub, opened in 2008, includes facilities for specialised research such as Xploratory-Labs; as well as Chemistry, Physics and Biology labs. It also houses the Discovery Labs, a Laser Animation/Technology Studio, the Materials Science Lab and the Raffles Academy Home Room. It is connected to the Yusof Ishak Block.

Hullett Memorial Library / Shaw Foundation Dining Hall
The Hullett Memorial Library (HML) stands between the Sheares Block and ArtSpace. Co-founded by Lim Boon Keng and Song Ong Siang, it was named after RI's longest-serving Headmaster, Richmond William Hullett, in 1923. The library's official founding (even though a library and museum, from which the National Museum originated, had existed for decades prior to 1923) also marked the centenary of the founding of the institution. The library traces its roots to the founding of RI, making it the oldest library in Singapore. The origins of Singapore's National Library lie in the HML.

Sports facilities 
The school's gymnasium underwent renovation in 2010, and was used as a training venue for gymnasts during the 2010 Summer Youth Olympics, together with that in the Year 5-6 campus. The school also has two tennis courts, two basketball courts, two squash courts, and two cricket nets.

Following the re-integration with Raffles Junior College from 2009, more sports facilities are available. Floorball, table tennis, judo and gymnastics are RI sports now able to use the Year 5-6 Campus facilities.

Notable alumni

Academia 
 Tan Eng Chye, President of the National University of Singapore

Arts 
 Alfian Sa'at, writer, poet and playwright
 Abdul Ghani Abdul Hamid, writer, poet and artist
 Chandran Nair, writer, poet and artist

Business 
 Robert Kuok, Malaysian billionaire
 Lim Boon Keng, philanthropist and co-founder of OCBC Bank and Singapore Chinese Girls' School
 Peter Lim, billionaire and owner of Valencia CF
 Andrew Ng, Chinese American computer scientist, former chief scientist at Baidu, co-founder of Coursera
 Andy Ong, entrepreneur, writer and property investor
 Min-Liang Tan, founder of tech company Razer Inc.

Politics 
Presidents
 Yusof Ishak, first President of Singapore
 Benjamin Henry Sheares, second President of Singapore
 Wee Kim Wee, fourth President of Singapore

Prime Ministers and Chief Ministers
 Lee Kuan Yew, first Prime Minister of Singapore
 Goh Chok Tong, second Prime Minister of Singapore
 David Marshall, first Chief Minister of Singapore
 Lim Yew Hock, second Chief Minister of Singapore

Speakers of Parliament
 Edmund W. Barker, second Speaker of Parliament
 Abdullah Tarmugi, seventh Speaker of Parliament
 Tan Chuan Jin, tenth Speaker of Parliament

Current Cabinet ministers
 Heng Swee Keat, Deputy Prime Minister of Singapore
 K. Shanmugam, Minister for Law and Minister for Home Affairs
 Chan Chun Sing, Minister for Education and Minister-in-charge of the Public Service
 Ong Ye Kung, Minister for Health
 Desmond Lee, Minister for National Development

People's Action Party members of parliament (MPs)
 Saktiandi Supaat, MP for Bishan–Toa Payoh GRC
 Seah Kian Peng, MP for Marine Parade GRC
 Zaqy Mohamad, MP for Marsiling–Yew Tee GRC

Workers' Party members of parliament (MPs)
 He Ting Ru, MP for Sengkang GRC
 Jamus Lim, MP for Sengkang GRC
 Dennis Tan, MP for Hougang SMC

Progress Singapore Party politicians
 Tan Cheng Bock, founder and leader of the Progress Singapore Party
 Leong Mun Wai, non-constituency MP

Former politicians
 Ahmad Mattar, former Cabinet minister
 Howe Yoon Chong, former Cabinet minister
 S. Jayakumar, former Cabinet minister
 Lee Yock Suan, former Cabinet minister
 Lim Hng Kiang, former Cabinet minister
 Raymond Lim, former Cabinet minister
 Othman Wok, former Cabinet minister
 S. Rajaratnam, former Cabinet minister
 Balaji Sadasivan, former People's Action Party MP for Ang Mo Kio GRC
 Png Eng Huat, former Workers' Party MP for Hougang SMC
 Viswa Sadasivan, former Nominated MP

Non-Singaporean politicians
 Abdul Razak Hussein, second Prime Minister of Malaysia
 Aziz Ishak, Malaysian politician
 Michael Chan, British politician
 Sardon Haji Jubir, Malaysian politician
 Tan Cheng Lock, Malaysian politician
 Tony Pua, Malaysian politician
 Ong Kian Ming, Malaysian politician
 Emil Elestianto Dardak, Indonesian politician

Public service 
Defence
 Ng Jui Ping, second Chief of Defence
 Bey Soo Khiang, third Chief of Defence
 Lim Chuan Poh, fourth Chief of Defence
 Perry Lim, ninth Chief of Defence
 Kirpa Ram Vij, former head of the Singapore Armed Forces

Education
 Ong Teck Chin, former principal of Anglo-Chinese School (Independent)
 Wong Siew Hoong, Director-General of the Ministry of Education and former headmaster of RI

Law
 T. S. Sinnathuray, Supreme Court judge
 Choor Singh, Supreme Court judge
 Ahmad Mohamed Ibrahim, first Attorney-General of Singapore
 Walter Woon, fifth Attorney-General of Singapore
 Charles Gregory Pestana, usher of the Second Magistrate's Court.

Foreign affairs
 Albert Chua, former Permanent Representative of Singapore to the United Nations
 Tommy Koh, former Permanent Representative of Singapore to the United Nations

Others
 Ambat Ravi Menon, managing director of the Monetary Authority of Singapore
 Tee Tua Ba, former police commissioner

Sports 
 Au Yeong Pak Kuan, former national footballer
 Daphne Chia, former national rhythmic gymnastics athlete, competed at the 2014 Commonwealth Games
 Choo Seng Quee, famed national football coach in the 1970s
 Quah Kim Song, former national footballer
 Soh Rui Yong, two-time SEA Games Marathon Champion and Singapore national record holder at 5,000m, 10,000m, Half Marathon and Marathon
 Cherie Tan, Bowling World Champion, six-time SEA Games Gold Medalist, two-time Asian Games Gold medalist

Religion  
 Kong Hee, founder and pastor of City Harvest Church
 Shi Ming Yi, Buddhist monk and former chief executive officer of Ren Ci Hospital and Medicare Centre

Others 
 Subhas Anandan, Singaporean criminal lawyer
 Prince Azim, Bruneian prince
 Lim Bo Seng, Singapore-based Chinese resistance fighter during World War II
 T. A. Sinnathuray, Malaysian professor of obstetrics and gynaecology
 Robert M. Solomon, Bishop of the Methodist Church in Singapore
 Leaena Tambyah, Singaporean social worker and founder of the first school for children with multiple disabilities in Singapore

See also 
 Education in Singapore

Notes

References

Bibliography 

 Wijeysingha, Eugene et al., (1992), One Man's Vision - Raffles Institution in Focus.
 Wijeysingha, Eugene (1985), The Eagle Breeds a Gryphon. 
 Raffles Programme. "Raffles Programme - Nurturing the Thinker, Leader and Pioneer" , Raffles Family of Schools, 2006, retrieved 7 December 2006.
 Seet, K. K. (1983). A place for the people (pp. 6–16). Singapore: Times Books International. 
 Wijeysingha, E. (1963). A history of Raffles Institution, 1823-1963. Singapore: University Education Press. 
 Makepeace, Walter; Brooke, Gilbert E.; Braddell, Roland St. J. (Eds.). (1991) [1921]. One hundred years of Singapore. Singapore: Oxford University Press. 
 Ng Sow Chan (1991). She is from the East (她来自东 /Ta lai zi dong). Singapore: Raffles Institution.

External links 

 Raffles Institution's website
 Raffles Girls' School (Secondary)'s website
 Raffles Programme's website 

Schools in Bishan, Singapore
Boarding schools in Singapore
Secondary schools in Singapore
Boys' schools in Singapore
Independent schools in Singapore
Schools offering Integrated Programme in Singapore
Raffles Institution alumni
Educational institutions established in 1823
1823 establishments in Singapore
Schools in Central Region, Singapore
Junior colleges in Singapore